Winning Streak is a 2012 Spanish comedy-drama film co-written and directed by Eduard Cortés. It stars an ensemble cast that includes Daniel Brühl, Lluís Homar, Miguel Ángel Silvestre, Eduard Fernández and Blanca Suárez. It is based on the exploits of the García-Pelayo family. The film premiered on 21 April 2012 at the 15th Málaga Film Festival.

Background 
The film is based on the life story and multifaceted personality of Gonzalo García-Pelayo Segovia, a Spanish citizen who had a diverse career as a film director, TV host, music producer, professional gambler, games expert, sponsor for professional poker players and creator of the online CRYPT-FIAT platform Mind.Capital, dedicated to buying and selling in the cryptocurrency exchange market.

Pelayo's great leap to fame came when he developed a legal statistics-and-betting system that allowed him to win more than 1.2 million euros in the game of roulette, in the early 1990s, with the help of his family. García-Pelayo is currently remembered throughout the world for having made "jump the bank" in different world casinos with the mentioned system. During the 1990s, "the Pelayos" were the public enemy of different casinos inside and outside Europe. His formula led them to earn as much as 13 million pesetas in a single night, something that did not sit well with some of the big casinos: in Las Vegas, the group was even threatened at gunpoint to stop them playing.

Years after making the headlines, Pelayo and his family chose to bet on online poker, launching an academy where they explained new methods that helped win it. One of his school's apprentices, Carlos Mortensen, became a poker world champion in 2001, sponsored by Pelayo. However, according to Pelayo, the new gaming regulations were limiting the profits, and as a result "all the good players we had decided to leave". As of 2017 Pelayo is still banned from entering casinos in France and Denmark.

Plot synopsis 
Gonzalo García Pelayo (Lluís Homar) has been trying for years to work out a system to legally win money in a local casino, which is run by the infamous The Beast (Eduard Fernández). When he realizes he has succeeded in doing so, using a system based on wheel bias, he drags his family in to help — son Iván (Daniel Brühl), daughter Vanessa (Marina Salas), their cousins Marcos (Oriol Vila) and muscle-bound Alfredo (Miguel Ángel Silvestre), and family friend Balón (Vicente Romero).

Driven by Ivan's desire to give his father a decent old age, the gang sets to work, at first unsuccessfully. But when they start winning, the Beast's suspicions are aroused, and he puts a private detective onto them. Alfredo compromises the plan by getting involved with croupier Ingrid (Blanca Suárez), who is summarily fired by the Beast. Next, Iván starts a romance with Chinese wild girl Shui (Hui Chi Chiu), whose friends turn out to be quite handy later on.

Cast 
 Daniel Brühl as Iván
 Lluís Homar as Gonzalo García Pelayo
 Miguel Ángel Silvestre as Alfredo
 Eduard Fernández as The Beast
 Oriol Vila as Marcos
 Vicente Romero as Balón
 Blanca Suárez as Ingrid
 Marina Salas as Vanessa
 Huichi Chiu as Shui

Release 
Winning Streak premiered at the 15th Málaga Film Festival on 21 April 2012, and began its theatrical run in Spain on 27 April 2012. The film was also released in theatres in Russia and Poland, and in Canada it was shown at both the Ottawa European Union Film Festival—on 16 November 2012—and the Vancouver European Union Film Festival on 23 November 2013. It was released straight-to-DVD in Brazil, Germany, Greece and Japan.

The film was on the program of the 2014 edition of Thailand's EU Film Festival, shown in the cities of Khon Kaen, Chiang Mai and Bangkok. Advertised as The Pelayos, the film was one of seven films that were shown in all three cities.

Reception

Critical response 
The film received mixed to negative reviews from film critics. Jonathan Holland of the Variety wrote, "Ocean's Eleven tries to become a Hispanic Magnificent Seven in Winning Streak a disappointingly straight-ahead take on one family's high-risk attempt to get rich by beating the casinos. Despite its terrific real-life storyline, a couple of fine perfs and slick visuals, the pic stumbles in its eagerness to please all comers, failing to generate much real tension and leaving its characters as flat as poker chips". Sonia Sanz of Cultture.com criticized actors Daniel Brühl, Lluís Homar, Oriol Vila, Eduard Fernández and Blanca Suárez for their "underwhelming" performances, and called the film itself "disappointing". Emilio Luna of the El Antepenúltimo Mohicano gave the film a rather negative review and awarded it with four out of ten stars.

In a more positive review of the film, Patrick Mullen of Cinemablographer.com wrote, "Brühl and Homar's work is worth noting since they manage to draw out characters that don't seem to be part of the film's thin script. [...] Winning Streak is a fun little caper all the same, slight as it may be. Winning Streak probably won't break the bank, but it should at least break even", and gave the film three out of five stars.

Awards and nominations

References

External links 
 
 

2010s adventure comedy-drama films
2012 films
Spanish films based on actual events
Films set in Spain
Films shot in Mallorca
Films shot in Barcelona
Films shot in Spain
2010s French-language films
2010s Mandarin-language films
Spanish adventure comedy-drama films
2010s Spanish-language films
2012 multilingual films
Spanish multilingual films
2010s Spanish films